Sagalassa coleoptrata is a moth in the family Brachodidae. It was described by Francis Walker in 1854. It is found in Brazil.

References

Brachodidae
Moths described in 1854